Es Sénia is a district in Oran Province, Algeria. It was named after its capital, Es Sénia.

Municipalities
The district is further divided into 3 municipalities:
Es Sénia
El Kerma
Sidi Chami

Districts of Oran Province